Indonesian National Route 6 is a main road in Java Island which connects Tegal and Cilacap.

Route
Tegal - Slawi - Prupuk - Bumiayu - Ajibarang - Wangon - Gumilir - Cilacap

References

6
Transport in Central Java